Baluchicardia is an extinct genus of fossil saltwater clams, marine bivalve molluscs in the family Carditidae. These clams were facultatively mobile infaunal suspension feeders.

Subtaxa
Some authors consider Baluchicardia a subgenus of Venericardia.

 Baluchicardia francescae  
 Venericardia (Baluchicardia) ameliae 
 Venericardia (Baluchicardia) amplicrenata 
 Venericardia (Baluchicardia) bulla 
 Venericardia (Baluchicardia) greggiana 
 Venericardia (Baluchicardia) hesperia 
 Venericardia (Baluchicardia) moa 
 Venericardia (Baluchicardia) whitei 
 Venericardia (Baluchicardia) wilcoxensis''

Distribution
Species within this genus have been found in the Eocene of the United States, in the Paleocene of Colombia and the United States and in the Cretaceous of Angola, Argentina, Brazil, Cameroon, Republic of the Congo, Egypt, France, Iran, Jordan, Libya, Morocco, Mozambique, Nigeria, Oman, Pakistan, Saudi Arabia, Senegal  and Tunisia.

References

Sepkoski, Jack Sepkoski's Online Genus Database – Bivalvia
Encyclopedia of Life

Carditidae
Prehistoric bivalve genera